The Manitoba Bisons are the athletic teams that represent the University of Manitoba in Winnipeg, Manitoba, Canada. The football team plays their games at Investors Group Field. The soccer team play their home games at the University of Manitoba Soccer Fields while the track and field teams use the University Stadium as their home track. The University has 18 different teams in 10 sports: basketball, curling, cross country running, Canadian football, golf, ice hockey, soccer, swimming, track & field, and volleyball.

Varsity sports

Ice hockey

Men's ice hockey
The Bisons iced a junior ice hockey team in the Manitoba Junior Hockey League. The Bisons won four consecutive Turnbull Cups as Manitoba junior champions in 1922, 1923, 1924, and 1925.

The 1923 Bisons team won the Allan Cup, Memorial Cup and Abbott Cup, and were inducted into the Manitoba Hockey Hall of Fame. The roster included J.A. Wise (Forward), C.E. Williams (Sub Forward), C.S. Doupe (Sub Goal), F. Robertson (Sub Defence), R.E. Moulden (Forward), A.I. Chapman (Defence), Blake Watson (Forward), Murray Murdoch (Captain & Centre), A.T. Puttee (Goal), J. Mitchell (Forward), A. Johnson (Defence), S.B. Field (Secretary/Treasurer), R.L. Bruce (Manager), H. Andrews (President), Hal Moulden (Coach), Walter Robertson (Trainer).

The school's senior ice hockey team won the 1931 World Ice Hockey Championships playing as the University of Manitoba Grads, and were inducted into the Manitoba Hockey Hall of Fame in the team category. The roster included Sammy McCallum, Gordon MacKenzie, Blake Watson, Art Puttee, Frank Morris, George Hill, Ward McVey, Jack Pidcock, Guy "Weary" Williamson.

In December 1934, the university appealed to W. A. Fry and the Amateur Athletic Union of Canada regarding a decision by the Manitoba Amateur Hockey Association (MAHA) which did not require university students be released from a private club team to play for the school team. Fry agreed with the university, stating that students are under the jurisdiction of the school unless released by the school to play for a club team. He also stated that AAU of C rulings should be respected by affiliated organizations, such as the MAHA.

The 1965 Bisons won the David Johnston University Cup as the Canadian Interuniversity Athletics Union champions, and were also inducted into the Manitoba Hockey Hall of Fame.

NHL alumni
List of National Hockey League alumni of the Bisons:

Other notable people
Wayne Fleming, National Hockey League coach, and Manitoba Bisons coach
Bob Lowes, Two-time Canadian Hockey League Coach of the Year
Claude C. Robinson, Canadian ice hockey and sports executive, inductee into the Hockey Hall of Fame and the Canadian Olympic Hall of Fame
Barry Trotz, 1994 Calder Cup and 2018 Stanley Cup champion head coach, two-time Jack Adams Award winner

Women's ice hockey

Football

The Bisons football program includes one of only four U Sports football teams to have won back-to-back Vanier Cup championships, having won in 1969 and 1970. In total, the Bisons have won three Vanier Cup national championships and 11 Hardy Trophy conference championships.

Notable players
Israel Idonije, Nigerian-Canadian professional American football defensive end, primarily for the Chicago Bears of the National Football League.
David Onyemata, Nigerian-Canadian professional American football defensive tackle for the New Orleans Saints of the National Football League (NFL 2016)

Soccer 
Manitoba Bisons ladies team plays in Canada West’s Universities Athletic Association.

Notable alumni 

Dalima Chhibber, Indian soccer player
 Gordon Orlikow (b. 1960), decathlon, heptathlon, and hurdles competitor, Athletics Canada Chairman, Canadian Olympic Committee member, Korn/Ferry International partner; competed for the Manitoba Bisons in track and field, and is honored on the Bisons Walkway of Honour.

Awards and honours
2020 Lieutenant Governor Athletic Awards: Kelsey Wog, Swimming

Athletes of the Year

Canada West Hall of Fame
Colleen Dufresne, Basketball Coach: Canada West Hall of Fame - 2019 Inductee 
Desiree Scott, Soccer: Canada West Hall of Fame - 2019 Inductee

References

External links
 

 
U Sports teams
Ice hockey teams representing Canada internationally